A photo-sculpture is the reproduction of persons, animals, and things, in 3-dimensions by taking a series of photos in the round and using them as synchronized photo projections to create a sculpture. The process was invented and patented by French artist (painter, sculptor and photographer) François Willème in 1860. He took a series of photographs from around a subject and used them  to carve a likeness of the figure. Contemporary photo sculptures are obtained through a process of 3D scanning and 3D printing. The results are small statues that represent the portrayed entity.
 
Examples of photographic sculptures include the work of sculptural artist Gwon Osang and experimental artist Oliver Herring.

References

Additional sources
 Sobieszek, Robert A. 1980. "Sculpture as the Sum of Its Profiles: François Willème and Photosculpture in France, 1859-1868". The Art Bulletin. 62 (4): 617–630.
 Leticia Azcue Brea y Mario Fernández Albarés. "La Photoscultpture. Su desarrollo en la España de Isabel II (1860-1868) = Photosculpture. Its development in the Spain of Isabella II (1860-1868)". Academia: Boletín de la Real Academia de Bellas Artes de san Fernando, Nº 116. Primer y segundo semestres de 2014, pp. 109–154, Madrid 2015, (es separata, español / inglés).

Photography
Sculpture